Alexandros Anagnostopoulos (born 18 August 1994) is a Greek professional footballer who plays as a goalkeeper for Super League 2 club Kifisia.

Honours
Panathinaikos
Greek Cup: 2013–14
Ionikos
Super League 2: 2020–21

References

1994 births
Living people
Super League Greece players
Football League (Greece) players
Super League Greece 2 players
Panathinaikos F.C. players
Aris Thessaloniki F.C. players
Apollon Smyrnis F.C. players
Association football goalkeepers
Footballers from Athens
Greek footballers